Jakob Glesnes (born 25 March 1994) is a Norwegian professional footballer who plays as a defender for the Philadelphia Union of Major League Soccer.

Club career

Early career 
He hails from Steinsland in Sund and started his career in local Skogsvåg IL. In 2010, he started playing regular senior football as he transferred to Hald. After half a season he went on to Løv-Ham, which was soon merged to form FK Fyllingsdalen. He stayed with Fyllingsdalen until the summer of 2015, when he stepped up one tier to First Division club Åsane.

Sarpsborg 08 
Glesnes had been on trial with multiple clubs domestic and abroad, including Liverpool FC, FC København, Brann, Sogndal, Hønefoss, Lillestrøm and Nest-Sotra. In 2016, he finally joined a first-tier club, Sarpsborg 08, and made his first-tier debut in March 2016 against Haugesund.

Strømsgodset
In March 2017, Glesnes was named captain for Strømsgodset. He scored his first goal for the club on 29 May 2017.

Philadelphia Union 
On 31 January 2020, Glesnes moved to the Philadelphia Union of Major League Soccer. Glesnes made headlines with his first goal for the Union, scoring a free kick from over 35 yards from goal against Los Angeles FC.

On 20 June 2021, Glesnes scored a late equalizer from well outside the 18-yard box to secure a 2–2 draw vs. Atlanta United. In the first round of the 2021 MLS Cup Playoffs on 20 November, he scored a long-distance screamer in the 123rd minute versus the New York Red Bulls to seal a 1–0 victory and send the Union to the Eastern Conference semifinals. On 8 December 2021, Glesnes signed a new, multi-year contract extension with the Union through the 2024 season.

On 19 October 2022, Glesnes was awarded the MLS Defender of the Year Award, becoming the first Philadelphia Union defender to win the award.

International career
In November 2016, Glesnes played for the Norway national under-21 team for 2017 UEFA European Under-21 Championship qualification.

In October 2019, he was selected for the Norway national team for the first time.

Career statistics

Club

Honours
Philadelphia Union
Supporters' Shield: 2020

Individual
MLS All-Star: 2022
MLS Defender of the Year: 2022
MLS Best XI: 2022

References

External links
 

1994 births
Living people
People from Sund, Norway
Norwegian footballers
Løv-Ham Fotball players
Åsane Fotball players
Sarpsborg 08 FF players
Strømsgodset Toppfotball players
Philadelphia Union players
Norwegian First Division players
Eliteserien players
Association football defenders
Norwegian expatriate footballers
Norwegian expatriate sportspeople in the United States
Major League Soccer players
Sportspeople from Vestland